Insect farming is the practice of raising and breeding insects as livestock, also referred to as minilivestock or micro stock. Insects may be farmed for the commodities they produce (like silk, honey, lac or insect tea), or for them themselves; to be used as food, as feed, as a dye, and otherwise.

Farming of popular insects

Silkworms 
Silkworms, the caterpillars of the domestic silkmoth, are kept to produce silk, an elastic fiber made when they are in the process of creating a cocoon. Silk is commonly regarded as a major cash crop and is used in the crafting of many textiles.

Mealworms 
The mealworm (Tenebrio molitor L.) is the larvae form of a species of darkling beetles (Coleoptera). The optimum incubation temperature is 25 ̊C - 27 ̊C and its embryonic development lasts 4 – 6 days. It has a long larvae period of about half a year with the optimum temperature and low moisture terminates. The protein content of Tenebrio molitor larvae, adult, exuvium and excreta are 46.44, 63.34, 32.87, and 18.51% respectively.

Buffaloworms 
Buffaloworms, also called lesser mealworms, is the common name of Alphitobius diaperinus. Its larvae superficially resemble small wireworms or true mealworms (Tenebrio spp.). They are approximately 7 to 11 mm in length at last instar. Freshly emerged larvae are a milky color. The pale color tinge returns to that of the first/second instar larva when preparing to molt, while a yellowish-brown appearance after molting. In addition, it was reported that it has the highest level of iron bioavailability.

Honeybees 
Commodities harvested from honeybees include beeswax, bee bread, bee pollen, propolis, royal jelly, brood, and honey. All of the aforementioned are mostly used in food, however, being wax, beeswax has many other uses, such as being used in candles, and propolis may be used as a wood finish. However, the presence of honeybees can negatively affect abundance and diversity of wild bees, with consequences for pollination of crops.

Lac insects 
Lac insects secrete a resinous substance called lac. Lac is used in many applications, from its use in food to being used as a colorant or as a wood finish. The majority of lac farming takes place in India and Thailand, with over 2 million residential employees.

Cochineal 
Made into a red dye known as carmine, cochineal are incorporated into many products, including cosmetics, food, paint, and fabric. About 100,000 insects are needed to make a single kilogram of dye. The shade of red the dye yields depends on how the insect is processed. France is the world's largest importer of carmine.

Crickets

Among the hundreds of different types of crickets, the house cricket (Acheta domesticus) is the most common type used for human consumption. The cricket is one of the most nutritious edible insects, and in many parts of the world, crickets are consumed dry-roasted, baked, deep-fried, and boiled. Cricket consumption may take the form of cricket flour, a powder of dried and ground crickets, which is easily integrated into many food recipes. Crickets are commonly farmed for non-human animal food, as they provide much nutrition to the many species of reptiles, fish, birds and other mammals that consume them. Crickets are normally killed by deep freezing, where they feel no pain and are sedated before neurological death.

Waxworms 
Waxworms are the larvae of wax moths. These caterpillars are used widely across the world for food, fish bait, animal testing and plastic degradation. Low in protein but high in fat content, they are a valuable source of fat for many insectivorous organisms. Waxworms are popular in many parts of the world, due to their ability to live in low temperatures and their simplicity in production.

Cockroaches

Cockroaches are farmed by the million in China, where they are used in traditional medicine and in cosmetics. The main species farmed is the American cockroach (Periplaneta americana). The cockroaches are reared on food such as potato and pumpkin peeling waste from restaurants, then scooped or vacuumed from their nests, killed in boiling water and dried in the sun.

As feed and food 

Insects show promise as animal feed. For instance, fly larvae can replace fish meal due to the similar amino acid composition. It is possible to formulate fish meal to increase unsaturated fatty acid. Wild birds and free-range poultry can consume insects in the adult, larval and pupal forms naturally. Grasshoppers and moths, as well as houseflies, have been used as feed supplements for poultry. Apart from that, insects have potential as feed for reptiles, soft monkey as well as birds.

Hundreds of species of crickets, grasshoppers, beetles, moths and various other insects are considered edible. Selected species are farmed for human consumption. Humans have been eating insects for as long as (according to some sources) 30,000 years. Today insects are becoming increasingly viable as a source of sustainably produced protein, as conventional meat forms are very land-intensive and produce large quantities of methane, a greenhouse gas. Insects bred in captivity offer a low space-intensive, highly feed-efficient, relatively pollution-free, high-protein source of food for both humans and non-human animals. Insects have a high nutritional value, dense protein content and micronutrient and probiotic potential. Insects such as crickets and mealworms have high concentrations of complete protein, vitamin B12, riboflavin and vitamin A. Insects offer an economical solution to increasingly pressing food security and environmental issues concerning the production and distribution of protein to feed a growing world population.

Benefits
Purported benefits of the use of insects as food include:
 Significantly lower amounts of resource and space use, lower amounts of waste produced, and emissions of very trace amounts of greenhouse gases. 
 They include many vitamins and essential minerals, contain dietary fiber (which is not present in meat), and are a complete protein. The protein count of 100 g of cricket is nearly equivalent to the amount in 100 g of lean ground beef.
 As opposed to meat, lower costs are required to care for and produce insects.
 Faster growth and reproduction rates. Crickets mature rather quickly and are typically full-grown within 3 weeks to a month, and an individual female can lay from 1,200 to 1,500 eggs in three to four weeks. Cattle, however, become adults at 2 years, and the breeding ratio is four breeding animals for each market animal produced.
 Unlike meat, insects rarely transmit diseases such as H1N1, mad cow disease, or salmonella.

Reduced feed 
Cattle use 12 times the amount of feed that crickets do to produce an equal amount of protein. Crickets also only use a quarter of the feed of sheep and one-half the amount of feed given to swine and chicken to produce an equivalent amount of protein. Crickets require only two pounds of feed to produce one pound of the finished product. Much of this efficiency is a result of crickets being ectothermic, as in they get their heat from the environment instead of having to expend energy to create their own body heat as typical mammals do.

Nutrient efficiency 
Insects are nutrient-efficient compared to other meat sources. The insect protein content is comparable to most meat products. Likewise, the fatty acid composition of edible insects is comparable to fish lipids, with high levels of polyunsaturated fatty acids (PUFAs). In addition, all parts of edible insect are efficiently used whereas some parts of conventional livestock are not directly available for human consumption.
The nutritional contents of insects vary with species as well as within species, depending on their metamorphic stage, habitat, and diet. For instance, the lipid composition of insects is largely dependent on their diet and metamorphic stage. Insects are abundant in other nutrients. Locusts, for example, contain between 8 and 20 mg of iron in every 100 grams of raw locust. Beef, on the other hand, contains roughly 6 mg of iron in the same amount of meat. Crickets are also very nutrient-efficient. For every 100 grams of substance, crickets contain 12.9 grams of protein, 121 calories, and 5.5 grams of fat. Beef contains more protein, with 23.5 grams in 100 grams of substance, but also has roughly three times the calories and four times the amount of fat as crickets do in 100 grams. Therefore, per 100 grams of substance, crickets contain only half the nutrients of beef, except for iron. High levels of iron are implicated in bowel cancer and heart disease.
When considering the protein transition, cold-blooded insects can convert food more efficiently: crickets only need 2.1 kg feed for 1 kg ‘meat’, while poultry and cows need more than 2 times and 12 times of the feed, respectively.

Greenhouse gas emissions 
The raising of livestock is responsible for 18% of all greenhouse gases emitted. Alternative sources of protein, such as insects, replace protein sourced from livestock and help decrease the number of greenhouse gases emitted from food production. Insects produce less carbon dioxide, ammonia and methane than livestock such as pigs and cattle, with no farmed insect species besides cockroaches releasing methane at all.

Land usage 
Livestock raising accounts for 70% of agricultural land use. This results in a land-cover change that destroys local ecosystems and displaces people and wildlife. Insect farming is minimally space-intensive compared to other conventional livestock, and can even take place in populated urban centers.

Processing methods 
With the concern for pain tolerance in animal health and welfare, processing the insects can be mainly concluded as: harvesting and cleaning, inactivation, heating and drying, depending on the final product and rearing methods.

Harvesting and cleaning 
Insects at different life stages can be collected by sieving followed by water cleaning when it is necessary to remove biomass or excretion. Before processing, the insects are sieved and stored alive at 4 ℃ for about one day without any feed.

Inactivation 
An inactivation step is needed to inactive any enzymes and microbes on the insects. The enzymatic browning reaction (mainly phenolase or phenol oxidase) can cause the brown or black color on the insect, which leads to discoloration and an off-flavor.

Heat-treatment 
Sufficient heat treatment is required to kill enterobacteriaceae so that the product can meet safety requirements. D-value and Z-value can be used to estimate the effectiveness of heat treatments. The temperature and duration of the heating will cause insect proteins' denaturation and changes the functional properties of proteins.

Drying 
To prevent spoilage, the products are dried to lower moisture content and prolong shelf life. Longer drying time results from a low evaporation rate due to the chitin layer, which can prevent the insect from dehydrating during their lifetime. So the product being in granule form gives the advantage of further drying. In general, insects have a moisture level in the range of 55-65%. A drying process decreasing the moisture content to a level of <10% is good for preservation.

Besides the moisture level, oxidation of lipids can cause high levels of unsaturated fatty acids. Hence the processing steps influencing the final fat stability in products are necessary to be considered during drying.

Regulations in Europe 
The use of insect meal as feed and food is limited by legislation. Insects can be used in Novel Food according to the European Union guidelines for market authorization of products. The European Union Commission accepted the use of insects for fish feed in July 2017. However, the power to promote the scale-up of insect production becomes difficult when few participate in this market to change the rules. In Europe, safety documents for certain insects and accompanying products are required by the European Union (EFSA) and NVWA.

Footnotes

References
 Humanity Needs to Start Farming Bugs, Popular Science
 Six-legged livestock: Edible insect farming, collection and marketing in Thailand, FAO
 Maybe It's Time To Swap Burgers for Bugs, NPR
 Bug farmer working to introduce insects to European diets, PRI
 Edible Insect Farming, FAO
 Eating insects: Sudden popularity 
 Apartment Bug Farm Is A Big Business, Modern Farmer
 U.N. Urges Eating Insects, National Geographic
 Insect Food Emissions, The Guardian
 One Green Planet
 Insect farming research & edible insect species list
 Professional Insect Rearing. Strategical points and management method, Books on Demand, November 2015.
 TedxTalks:Recipes for the future

See also
 Entomophagy
 Butterfly ranching in Papua New Guinea
 Insect Farming and Trading Agency
 Welfare of farmed insects
 Cricket flour
 Maggot farming

 
Animal husbandry
Animal rights
Animal welfare
Insects as food
Livestock